Leroy Hill Jr. (born September 14, 1982) is a former American football linebacker. He played high school football in Milledgeville, Georgia for the Baldwin High School Braves. He was selected with the 34th pick of the third round of the 2005 NFL Draft out of Clemson University by the Seahawks.

Professional career

Injuries to starting veteran linebacker Jamie Sharper put him into the starting lineup in his rookie year, and he did very well, totaling 72 tackles and 7.5 sacks from the outside linebacker position. He and rookie middle linebacker Lofa Tatupu were two of the biggest contributors to the 2005 Seahawks squad that went to Super Bowl XL.   In the 2009 offseason, Hill was tagged as the Seahawks franchise player. The Seahawks removed the franchise tag on Hill on April 26, 2009, making him a free agent because the Seahawks drafted highly touted Wake Forest Linebacker Aaron Curry at number 4 overall in the 2009 NFL Draft. However, several days later, on April 30, 2009, Hill re-signed with the Seahawks on a 6-year, $38 million contract.

Legal
In January 2009, Hill was arrested in Atlanta for marijuana possession after police found him passed out behind the wheel of his car at an intersection. On April 11, 2010, Hill was arrested on suspicion of domestic abuse in Issaquah, WA when he hit his girlfriend leaving "obvious injuries" according to the Issaquah Police Department. In August 2010, a court decided that the case would be dismissed if he completed a one-year domestic-violence treatment program, had no law violations and possessed no weapons in the next 18 months.

Hill was arrested on February 24, 2012 on a possession of marijuana charge, after a search warrant was served at his Buckhead residence. The charges were dropped on March 5, 2012 after a urine test taken after the arrest came up negative. In January 2013, Hill was arrested and charged with unlawful imprisonment and third-degree assault relating to a domestic violence incident. In May 2013, the prosecutor's office said the case was insufficient as a felony.

References

1982 births
Living people
People from Jones County, Georgia
American football linebackers
Clemson Tigers football players
Seattle Seahawks players
Players of American football from Georgia (U.S. state)